The Austrian Regional League West was a third-tier division of Austrian football introduced in the 1980–81 season as successor of the Alpenliga. It covered the Austrian states of Salzburg, Tyrol (excepting East Tyrol) and Vorarlberg and was one of three leagues at this level.

2019–20 reformation
Due to high travel costs, the Vorarlberg and Tyrol clubs decide to form their own Elite ligas, forcing Salzburg to do so as well. The Eliteliga will be divided in a Regionalliga Salzburg, Regionalliga Tirol and Eliteliga Vorarlberg in the fall with 10 clubs each. The two best teams of these three regional leagues play in an Eliteliga play-off for promotion to the 2nd league.

Recent league champions
The most recent league champions:

References

External links
 Austrian Regional League West tables & results at soccerway.com

Wes